The 2011 ICC World Cricket League Division Two was a cricket tournament  that took place between 8–15 April 2011. It formed part of the ICC World Cricket League and qualifying for the 2015 Cricket World Cup. The United Arab Emirates hosted the event.  The matches in the competition had List A status.

Teams
The teams that took part in the tournament were decided according to the results of the 2009 ICC World Cup Qualifier and the 2011 ICC World Cricket League Division Three.

Squads

Fixtures

Group stage

Points table

Matches

Playoffs

5th place playoff

3rd place playoff

Final

Final Placings

Statistics

Most runs
The top five highest run scorers (total runs) in the season are included in this table.

Most wickets
The following table contains the five leading wicket-takers of the season.

References

2011 Division Two